Also known as the .320 European or .320 Bulldog, this revolver cartridge was designed for the Webley Bull Dog pocket revolver in the 1870s and similar revolvers made in Belgium that followed.

The round was manufactured until the 1920s and was briefly made by Fiocchi in 2015.

In Brazil, both guns and ammo (double-barreled, side by side pistols) was made up to 1960s. Amadeo Rossi made his Model 8 "Garrucha" in .320 from 1950 to 1962.

The .32 Short Colt was based on the .320 but had a different sized rim. On some guns the .32 Short Colt will actually fit and cycle properly.

References

Pistol and rifle cartridges